(The) Computer Chronicles is an American half-hour television series, which was broadcast from 1983 to 2002 on Public Broadcasting Service (PBS) public television and which documented various issues from the rise of the personal computer from its infancy to the global market at the turn of the 21st century.

History and overview
The series was created  by Stewart Cheifet (later the show's co-host), who was then the station manager of the College of San Mateo's KCSM-TV (now independent non-commercial KPJK). The show was initially broadcast as a local weekly series beginning in 1981. The show was, at various points in its run, produced by KCSM-TV, WITF-TV in Harrisburg, Pennsylvania, and KTEH in San Jose. It became a national series on PBS in 1983, running until 2002, with Cheifet as host.

Gary Kildall, founder of the software company Digital Research, served as Cheifet's co-host from 1983 to 1990, providing insights and commentary on products, as well as discussions on the future of the ever-expanding personal computer sphere. After Kildall left the show (upon his death in 1994, the show paid tribute to him in a special episode the next year), Cheifet would serve as solo host from 1991 onward.

Computer Chronicles had several supporting presenters appearing alongside Cheifet, including:
 George Morrow: Presenter, commentator and occasional co-host, who for a time headed the Morrow Design company, Morrow was a well-known face on the Chronicles until the 1990s. Morrow died in 2003.
 Paul Schindler: Featured predominantly in software reviews, Schindler contributed to the series until the early 1990s.
Tim Bajarin: author and columnist who appeared on a few of the 1990s episodes as a co-host and contributor.
 Wendy Woods: Provided reports for many software and hardware products, as well as talking with the main presenters in the studio about specific topics.
 Janelle Stelson: presented the news and reviews segment.
Jan Lewis: Former president of Xerox PARC, served as both co-host and interviewee throughout the 1980s.
Herb Lechner: with SRI International, served as both co-host and interviewee on some of the earliest episodes.

Format

The Computer Chronicles format remained relatively unchanged throughout its run, except perhaps with the noticeable difference in presenting style; originally formal, with Cheifet and the guests wearing business suits (with neckties) customary in the professional workplace in the early 1980s, it evolved by the 1990s into a more relaxed, casual style, with Cheifet and guests adopting the "business casual" style of dress that the Silicon Valley computer industry arguably helped pioneer.

Beginning in 1984, the last five minutes or so featured Random Access, a segment that gave the viewer the latest computer news from the home and business markets. Stewart Cheifet, Janelle Stelson, Maria Gabriel and various other individuals presented the segment. Random Access was discontinued in 1997. The Online Minute, introduced in 1995 and lasting until 1997, gave the viewers certain Web sites that dealt with the episode's topic. It featured Giles Bateman, who designed the show's "Web page" opening sequence that was used from that period up until the show's end.

The opening graphics were changed in 1989, and the show was renamed "Computer Chronicles", omitting the word "The". The graphics were redesigned again in 1995, with the "Web page" graphics designed by Giles Bateman, and redesigned again in 1998 to show clips from the show in a "multiple window" format.

The theme tune from 1983 to 1989 was "Byte by Byte" by Craig Palmer for the Network Music Library. From 1990 until the show's end, the theme song was Zenith, composed for OmniMusic by John Manchester.

Another feature on the show was Stewart's "Pick of the Week", in which he detailed a popular piece of software or gadget on the market that appealed to him and might appeal to the home audience.

From 1994 to 1997, the show was produced by PCTV, based in New Hampshire in cooperation with KCSM-TV. Starting in the fall of 1997 and continuing to its end, the show was produced by KTEH San Jose and Stewart Cheifet Productions.

Availability
The show ended its run in 2002. Almost all episodes of Computer Chronicles have been made available for free download at the Internet Archive. Many episodes of the show have been dubbed into other languages, including Arabic, French and Spanish.

See also
 Net Cafe, de facto spin-off of Computer Chronicles co-hosted by Cheifet that aired from 1996 to 2002
 WDR Computerclub, similar show in German TV

References

External links
 
archive.org - Computer Bowl archives
Computer Chronicles history and information

American non-fiction television series
PBS original programming
1981 American television series debuts
1990s American television series
2002 American television series endings
Computer television series